Saint-Jouin-de-Blavou is a commune in the Orne department in the Normandy region of north-western France. Its inhabitants are known as Jovinians.

Demography

Places of interest

 Church of Saint-Jouin (sixteenth century)
 The manor house of Blavou (sixteenth century) and its bread oven, classified as historic monuments
 The château de Chanceaux (sixteenth century) and its chapel of Saint-Marc (seventeenth century), also classified as historic monuments

See also
Communes of the Orne department

References

Saintjouindeblavou